Canibacter oris is a Gram-positive, facultatively anaerobic, non-spore-forming and non-motile species of bacteria from the family of Microbacteriaceae, which has been isolated from a human wound caused by a dog bite in Australia.

References

Microbacteriaceae
Bacteria described in 2014
Monotypic bacteria genera